Mark R. Maynard is a Republican member of the West Virginia Senate, representing the 6th district since January 14, 2015.

He is the owner of a used car lot and towing business. During the 2016 U.S. presidential election, Maynard co-chaired Donald Trump's presidential campaign in West Virginia.

Election results

References

External links
West Virginia Legislature - Senator Mark R. Maynard official government website
Project Vote Smart - Senator Mark R. Maynard (WV) profile

1972 births
Living people
People from Wayne County, West Virginia
Politicians from Huntington, West Virginia
Baptists from West Virginia
Republican Party West Virginia state senators
Businesspeople from West Virginia
Marshall University alumni
21st-century American politicians